Stigmaria is a form taxon for common fossils found in Carboniferous rocks. They represent the underground rooting structures of arborescent lycophytes such as Sigillaria and Lepidodendron. These swamp forest trees grew to 50 meters and were anchored by an extensive network of branching underground structures with "rootlets" attached to them. Analysis of the morphology and anatomy of these stigmarian systems suggests they were shoot-like and so they are called rhizomes or rhizophores. The stigmarian rhizomes are typically covered with a spiral pattern of circular scars where "rootlets" were attached. Since the stigmarian systems are shoot-like, these "rootlets" may be modified leaves, adapted to serve the function of roots. However, some paleontologists argue that the "rootlets" were true roots, with a complex branching structure and root hairs, comparable to the roots of the closest living relative of Lepidodendron, the quillworts (genus Isoetes).

References

Prehistoric lycophytes
Carboniferous plants
Prehistoric plants of North America
Fossils of Georgia (U.S. state)
Paleozoic life of New Brunswick
Paleozoic life of the Northwest Territories
Paleozoic life of Nova Scotia
Prehistoric lycophyte genera